
Gmina Cegłów is a rural gmina (administrative district) in Mińsk County, Masovian Voivodeship, in east-central Poland.

Villages
Gmina Cegłów contains the villages and settlements of Cegłów, Huta Kuflewska, Kiczki Drugie, Kiczki Pierwsze, Mienia, Pełczanka, Piaseczno, Podciernie, Podskwarne, Posiadały, Rososz, Rudnik, Skupie, Skwarne, Tyborów, Wiciejów, Wola Stanisławowska, Wólka Wiciejowska and Woźbin.

Neighbouring gminas
Gmina Cegłów is bordered by the gminas of Jakubów, Kałuszyn, Latowicz, Mińsk Mazowiecki, Mrozy and Siennica.

References

Polish official population figures 2006

Ceglow
Mińsk County